Khosrowabad (also Romanized as Khosrowābād; also known as Khusrauābād and Khūsrūabad) is a village in Khosrowabad Rural District, Chang Almas District, Bijar County, Kurdistan Province, Iran. At the 2006 census, its population was 510, in 129 families. The village is populated by Kurds.

References 

Towns and villages in Bijar County
Kurdish settlements in Kurdistan Province